Indo-Pacific beads are a type of mainly tube drawn glass beads which originated in the Indian Subcontinent but manufactured widely in South east asia. These are usually 6mm in diameter, undecorated and come in various colours for example green, yellow, black, opaque red, etc.

Production Technique 
Glass beads are made using three methods, winding, drawing or moulding.

Drawn beads 
This method of production involves creating a hollow cavity inside the molten glass by blowing air bubble inside using a 3mm tube. The round shape of the glass is then drawn into a tube and cooled, in India this is called Ladah method. One meter long tube is then broken off which is then broken into smaller bead lengths.

Distribution 
Indo Pacific beads traded widely from East Asia  to Africa. They reached Europe in early medieval period. They may have been the single most widely traded item in history.

History 
Scholars place the manufacturing of the Indo Pacific beads in South India and Southeast Asia between 500-200 BCE.

References 

Glass art
Jewellery
Indian art
Beadwork